The Revista de la Sociedad Venezolana Química (CODEN RSVQAQ), is a Venezolanan scientific journal in chemistry. It was founded in 1944 by the Sociedad Venezolana Química (SVQ), Caracas. The latest published volume is 26 (2003).

Chemistry journals